The Celebration Bowl is a postseason college football bowl game, first played in the 2015 season, contested between the champions of the Mid-Eastern Athletic Conference (MEAC) and the Southwestern Athletic Conference (SWAC)—the two prominent conferences of historically black colleges and universities (HBCUs) in NCAA Division I. It serves as the de facto national championship of black college football. The game is held annually in Atlanta on the third weekend of December, and has been played at the Georgia Dome and Mercedes-Benz Stadium. It is currently the only active bowl game to feature teams from the Football Championship Subdivision (FCS).

History
The Celebration Bowl is a successor to two previous bowl games between the MEAC and SWAC, the Pelican Bowl and Heritage Bowl. Because the Celebration Bowl takes place during the FCS playoff tournament, neither the SWAC nor the MEAC can send their champion to the tournament. At the time the Celebration Bowl was inaugurated, the SWAC's regular season already extended too late into the year for its champion to enter the FCS playoffs, while the MEAC dropped its automatic bid to the FCS playoffs in order to send its champion to the Celebration Bowl.

The game is organized by ESPN Events, which also runs the MEAC/SWAC Challenge, the annual interconference game between the two conferences held over Labor Day weekend. The Celebration Bowl was sponsored by the Air Force Reserve for three playings: 2015, 2016, and 2018.  On December 9, 2020, Cricket Wireless signed on as title sponsor of the game, formally making it the Cricket Celebration Bowl.

In June 2017, the SWAC announced that it would discontinue the  SWAC Championship Game following the 2017 playing, resulting in the SWAC regular season champion automatically qualifying for the Celebration Bowl. However, in June 2018, the SWAC reversed course and continues to hold its championship game, with the winner advancing to the Celebration Bowl.

In 2020, the Celebration Bowl was not played, after the MEAC canceled all fall athletics due to the COVID-19 pandemic and the SWAC postponed its football season into the spring of 2021.

Game results

MVPs

Two MVPs are selected for each game; one an offensive player, the other a defensive player.

Most appearances
Updated through the December 2022 playing (7 games, 13 total appearances). Wins appear in bold font in the Years column.

Game records

Broadcasting
Television and radio coverage of the bowl has included play-by-play announcers, color commentators, and sideline reporters.

Television

Radio

See also
 List of college bowl games
 African Americans in Atlanta
MEAC/SWAC Challenge

Notes

References

External links

 
College football bowls
American football competitions in Atlanta
Annual sporting events in the United States
2015 establishments in Georgia (U.S. state)
Black college football classics
College sports in Georgia (U.S. state)